Meta noise refers to inaccurate or irrelevant Metadata recorded in a computerised data repository.

Meta noise may also refer to:

Meta noise (Metadata tag), a Metadata tag to encapsulate or describe an audio event

See also
Noise (disambiguation)